The Belgian men's national under 20 ice hockey team is the national under-20 ice hockey team in Belgium. The team represents Belgium at the International Ice Hockey Federation's World Junior Hockey Championship Division II.

International competitions

References

Ice hockey in Belgium
Ice hockey
Junior national ice hockey teams